Shinkodoroku Dam is an earthfill dam located in Aomori Prefecture in Japan. The dam is used for flood control and irrigation. The catchment area of the dam is 24.1 km2. The dam impounds about 24  ha of land when full and can store 1750 thousand cubic meters of water. The construction of the dam was completed in 1967.

References

Dams in Aomori Prefecture
1967 establishments in Japan